Kylee Vincent (born 15 July 1994; née Brown) is a South African dancer and choreographer. She is a former UK Latin Champion.

Early life 
Vincent was born in Pretoria, South Africa. Vincent began dancing at the age of eight.

Career 
Vincent is a WDC South Africa Under 21 Latin Champion. In 2011, she won the Under 21 WDC World Latin Championships. In 2012, she was the Under 21 Open British Latin Championship in Blackpool in 2012.

In 2013, Vincent joined the touring dance company Burn the Floor. She has toured the world with the company every year since.

In 2018 and 2019, Vincent joined Strictly Come Dancing professional, Giovanni Pernice as a dancer on his solo tour.

Dancing with the Stars 
In November 2019, it was confirmed that Vincent would be joining the cast of the Irish series of Dancing with the Stars as a professional dancer. For her first season, Vincent was paired with singer and priest, Fr. Ray Kelly. Despite consistently being the lowest scoring couple throughout the season, Kelly and Vincent managed to reach Week 10 of the competition, eventually finishing in fifth place.

In 2022, Vincent was paired with comedian, Neil Delamere. They were eliminated in the fourth week of the season, finishing in eleventh place.

In 2023, Vincent was paired with singer and former Glee actor, Damian McGinty. They reached the final, finishing as joint runners-up to Carl Mullan & Emily Barker.

Highest and Lowest Scoring Per Dance

Performances with Fr. Ray Kelly

Performances with Neil Delamere

Performances with Damian McGinty

Personal life 
In May 2017, Vincent married fellow professional dancer, Stephen Vincent. They met while touring on Burn the Floor together.

References 

1994 births
Living people
South African ballroom dancers